The Ernest Green Story is a 1993 American made-for-television biographical film which follows the true story of Ernest Green (Morris Chestnut) and eight other African-American high-school students (dubbed the "Little Rock Nine") as they embark on their historic journey to integrate Little Rock Central High School in Little Rock, Arkansas, in 1957. The film was developed and executive produced by Carol Ann Abrams. Much of the movie was filmed on location at Central High School.

The film had its world premiere at Little Rock Central High School, with an introduction by President-Elect of the United States Bill Clinton. It aired on the Disney Channel on January 17, 1993. Later that year,  A.M.L. Productions and the Disney Channel received a Peabody Award for presenting "a story which reminds adults and teaches children about the courageous steps taken toward the elimination of discrimination in American society".

Cast

Crisis at Central High
The Ernest Green Story was actually the second made-for-television film to depict the events of the Little Rock Crisis. In 1981, CBS aired Crisis at Central High, which was told from the point-of-view of former assistant principal Elizabeth Huckaby. There, Ernest Green was portrayed by Calvin Levels. Meanwhile, Minnijean Brown was portrayed in Crisis at Central High by Regina Taylor and Carlotta Walls was portrayed by Riona Martin.

See also
 Civil rights movement in popular culture
 Crisis at Central High

Notes
 The original version of the movie includes gospel singer Mahalia Jackson's well-known rendition of the song, Take My Hand, Precious Lord. A subsequent version replaces the song with the hymn, It Is Well with My Soul.

References

External links
 
 

Peabody Award-winning broadcasts
G
American television films
African-American films
Disney Channel original films
American political drama films
Films about race and ethnicity
American films based on actual events
Films set in Arkansas
Films shot in Arkansas
Films set in the 1950s
Films set in 1957
American coming-of-age films
American biographical films
Civil rights movement in television
1993 television films
1993 films
Films directed by Eric Laneuville
Films scored by Mason Daring
1990s English-language films
1990s American films